Tito Pereyra (born 1 February 1949) is an Argentine boxer. He competed in the men's flyweight event at the 1968 Summer Olympics. At the 1968 Summer Olympics he defeated Robert Carney of Australia in the Round of 32 before losing to Tetsuaki Nakamura of Japan in the Round of 16.

References

External links
 

1949 births
Living people
Argentine male boxers
Olympic boxers of Argentina
Boxers at the 1968 Summer Olympics
Sportspeople from Córdoba, Argentina
Flyweight boxers